Mario Francis Puzo (October 15, 1920 – July 2, 1999) was an American author, screenwriter, and journalist. He is known for his crime novels about the Italian-American Mafia and Sicilian Mafia, most notably The Godfather (1969), which he later co-adapted into a film trilogy directed by Francis Ford Coppola. He received the Academy Award for Best Adapted Screenplay for the first film in 1972 and for Part II in 1974. Puzo also wrote the original screenplay for the 1978 Superman film and its 1980 sequel. His final novel, The Family, was released posthumously in 2001.

Personal life
Puzo was born in the Hell's Kitchen section of New York City to Italian immigrants from Pietradefusi, Province of Avellino, Campania. When Puzo was 12, his father, who worked as a trackman for the New York Central Railroad, was committed to the Pilgrim State Hospital insane asylum for schizophrenia, and his wife, Maria, was left to raise their seven children. He served in the US Army Air Forces in Germany in World War II, and later graduated from the City College of New York. Puzo married a German woman, Erika, with whom he had five children. When Erika died of breast cancer at the age of 58 in 1978, her nurse, Carol Gino, became Puzo's companion.

Career
In 1950, his first short story, "The Last Christmas," was published in American Vanguard. After the war, he wrote his first book, The Dark Arena, which was published in 1955.

In 1960, Bruce Jay Friedman hired Puzo as an assistant editor of a group of men's pulp magazines with titles such as Male, Men. Under the pen name Mario Cleri, Puzo wrote World War II adventure features for magazine True Action.

In 1969, Puzo's best-known work, The Godfather, was published. Puzo stated that this story came from research into organized crime, not from personal experience, and that he was looking to write something that would appeal to the masses. The novel remained on The New York Times Best Seller list for 67 weeks and sold over nine million copies in two years. The book was later developed into the film The Godfather (1972), directed by Francis Ford Coppola. Paramount Pictures originally found out about Puzo's novel in 1967 when a literary scout for the company contacted then Paramount Vice President of Production Peter Bart about Puzo's unfinished sixty-page manuscript. Bart believed the work was "much beyond a Mafia story" and offered Puzo a $12,500 option for the work, with an option for $80,000 if the finished work were made into a film. Despite Puzo's agent telling him to turn down the offer, Puzo was desperate for money and accepted the deal. Paramount's Robert Evans relates that, when they met in early 1968, he offered Puzo the $12,500 deal for the 60-page manuscript titled Mafia  after the author confided in him that he urgently needed $10,000 to pay off gambling debts. The film received three awards of the 11 Oscar category nominations, including Puzo's Oscar for Best Adapted Screenplay.

Coppola and Puzo then collaborated on sequels to the original film, The Godfather Part II (1974) and The Godfather Part III (1990). Coppola and Puzo preferred the title The Death of Michael Corleone for the third film, but Paramount Pictures found that unacceptable. In September 2020, for the film's 30th anniversary, it was announced that a new cut of the film titled Mario Puzo's The Godfather, Coda: The Death of Michael Corleone would have a limited theatrical release in December 2020 followed by digital and Blu-ray. Coppola said the film is the version he and Puzo had originally envisioned, and it "vindicates" its status among the trilogy.

In mid-1972, Puzo wrote the first draft of the script for the 1974 disaster film Earthquake, but he was unable to continue work because of his prior commitment to The Godfather Part II.  Work continued on the script without his involvement, with writer George Fox (working on his first, and only, motion picture screenplay) and producer / director Mark Robson, who remained uncredited as a writer. Puzo retained screen credit in the completed film as a result of a quickly-settled lawsuit over story credit (most elements from his first draft made it into the final film), and Puzo's name subsequently featured heavily in the advertising. Puzo also wrote the original screenplay for Richard Donner's Superman, which then also included the plot for Superman II, as they were originally written as one film. He also collaborated on the stories for the 1982 film A Time to Die and the 1984 Francis Ford Coppola film The Cotton Club.

In 1991, Puzo's speculative fiction The Fourth K was published; it centres on a fictional member of the Kennedy family dynasty who becomes President of the United States early in the 2000s.

Puzo never saw the publication of his penultimate book, Omertà, but the manuscript was finished before his death, as was the manuscript for The Family. However, in a review originally published in the San Francisco Chronicle, Jules Siegel, who had worked closely with Puzo at Magazine Management Company, speculated that Omertà may have been completed by "some talentless hack". Siegel also acknowledged the temptation to "rationalize avoiding what is probably the correct analysis — that [Puzo] wrote it and it is terrible".

Death
Puzo died of heart failure on July 2, 1999, at his home in Bay Shore, New York, at the age of 78.

In popular culture
In April 2022, Paramount+ began streaming The Offer, a 10-episode dramatic mini-series telling a fictionalized story of the making of The Godfather, including Puzo's decision to write the first book in what came to be a series. Patrick Gallo plays Puzo. Victoria Kelleher plays his wife, Erika.

Works

Novels
 The Dark Arena (1955)
 The Fortunate Pilgrim (1965)
 The Runaway Summer of Davie Shaw (1966)
 Six Graves to Munich (1967), as Mario Cleri
 Fools Die (1978)
 The Fourth K (1990)
 The Last Don (1996)
 Omertà (2000)
 The Family (2001) (completed by Puzo's longtime girlfriend Carol Gino)

Series
 The Godfather (1969)
 The Sicilian (1984) - takes place between the 6th and the 7th books of The Godfather

Non-fiction
 "Test Yourself: Are You Heading for a Nervous Breakdown?" as Mario Cleri (1965)
 The Godfather Papers and Other Confessions (1972)
 Inside Las Vegas (1977)

Short stories

All short stories, except "The Last Christmas", were written under the pseudonym Mario Cleri.

 "The Last Christmas" (1950)
 "John 'Red' Marston's Island of Delight" (1964)
 "Big Mike's Wild Young Sister-in-law" (1964)
 "The Six Million Killer Sharks That Terrorize Our Shores" (1966) 
 "Trapped Girls in the Riviera's Flesh Casino" (1967)
 "The Unkillable Six" (1967)
 "Girls of Pleasure Penthouse" (1968)
 "Order Lucy For Tonight" (1968) 
 "12 Barracks of Wild Blondes" (1968) 
 "Charlie Reese's Amazing Escape from a Russian Death Camp" (1969)

Screenplays and film adaptations
 The Godfather (1972)
 Earthquake (1974 - August, 1972 script draft only)
 The Godfather Part II (1974)
 Superman (1978)
 Superman II (1980)
 A Time to Die (1982)
 The Cotton Club (1984)
 The Sicilian (1987)
 The Fortunate Pilgrim (1988)
 The Godfather Part III (1990)
 Christopher Columbus: The Discovery (1992)
 The Last Don (1997)
 Superman II: The Richard Donner Cut (2006)
 The Godfather, Coda: The Death of Michael Corleone (2020)

Video game adaptations
The Godfather (1991)
The Godfather (2006)
The Godfather II (2009)

See also 
 The Godfather (book series)

References

Further reading

External links

 FreshAir Interview – Audio interview from Fresh Air. Originally broadcast July 25, 1996.
 
 
 The Official Mario Puzo Library
 "Saying Goodbye to Mario Puzo", an affectionate recollection of Mario Puzo written by his friend Jules Siegel on being notified of his death.

1920 births
1999 deaths
20th-century American novelists
American male novelists
American crime fiction writers
American male screenwriters
United States Army Air Forces personnel of World War II
American science fiction writers
City College of New York alumni
American writers of Italian descent
Organized crime novelists
People from Hell's Kitchen, Manhattan
People from Islip (town), New York
Writers Guild of America Award winners
Writers from Manhattan
Military personnel from New York City
United States Army Air Forces soldiers
Best Screenplay Golden Globe winners
Best Adapted Screenplay Academy Award winners
Hugo Award-winning writers
20th-century American male writers
Novelists from New York (state)
Screenwriters from New York (state)
20th-century American screenwriters
20th-century pseudonymous writers